Henricus montanus is a species of moth of the family Tortricidae. It is found in Venezuela.

The wingspan is about 21 mm. The ground colour of the forewings is cream grey near the tornal part of the termen, less distinct towards the apex and costa and otherwise suffused brown and sprinkled with dark brown. The hindwings are cream, slightly tinged with brownish towards the apex, with delicate brownish strigulae (fine streaks).

Etymology
The species name refers to the type locality.

References

Moths described in 2006
Henricus (moth)